SC Prometei Dniprodzerzhynsk was a Soviet football club from Dniprodzerzhynsk, Dnipropetrovsk Oblast. The club was founded in 1947 and participated in the Soviet competition until 1970.

History
The club was founded in 1947 as Traktor Dniprodzerzhynsk under the patronage of a secretive Soviet Factory of Slag Fertilizers, a part of the Soviet Defense Industry Complex. The club entered regional competitions of Dnipropetrovsk Oblast in 1951. In 1952 Traktor entered the republican stage and after being promoted to upper league changed its name to Khimik. From 1957 to 1970 the club competed in the Soviet Class B championship (analogous with a third level of league system). In 1962 Khimik changed its name to Dnieprovets and in 1967 - to Prometei. In 1970 the extra funding for the club from the city authorities ended and the club withdrew from the professional ranks. Being sponsored by the factory only (by then renamed as Trans-Dnieper Chemical Plant), the club continued to play in the city championship and only rarely participated in the regional competitions.

In 2007, the Trans-Dnieper Chemical Plant was officially announced bankrupt.

League and Cup history

{|class="wikitable"
|-bgcolor="#efefef"
! Season
! Div.
! Pos.
! Pl.
! W
! D
! L
! GS
! GA
! P
!Domestic Cup
!colspan=2|Europe
!Notes                                                         
|}

See also
 FC Prometei Dniprodzerzhynsk
 FC Stal Kamianske

References

External links
 Над Днепропетровщиной нависла радиоактивная угроза (Over the Dnipropetrovsk Oblast has overhung a radioactive threat)
 Радиационное загрязнение в результате деятельности производственного объединения «Приднепровский химический завод» (ПХЗ) г. Днепродзержинска (Radioactive pollution as the result of activity of the industrial association "Trans-Dnieper Chamical Plant" of Dniprodzerzhynsk city)
 О радиации в Украине (About radiation in Ukraine)

Defunct football clubs in Ukraine
Defunct football clubs in the Soviet Union
Football clubs in Kamianske
Association football clubs established in 1947
Association football clubs disestablished in 1970
1947 establishments in Ukraine
1970 disestablishments in Ukraine